Wechter is a surname. Notable people with the surname include:

 Abraham Wechter, American luthier
 Julius Wechter (1935–1999), American musician and composer
 Georg Wechter (1526–1586), German painter and engraver
 Esaias Wechter (1701–1776), Finnish merchant, industrialist, and politician